Brandon Sean Michael Brennan (born July 26, 1991) is an American professional baseball pitcher for the Tecolotes de los Dos Laredos of the Mexican League. He has previously played in Major League Baseball (MLB) for the Seattle Mariners and Boston Red Sox.

Amateur career 
Brennan attended Capistrano Valley High School in Mission Viejo, California. The Colorado Rockies selected Brennan in the 40th round of the 2010 MLB draft, but Brennan did not sign. Brennan attended the University of Oregon as a freshman in 2011, but took a redshirt and did not play for the Oregon Ducks. Brennan chose to transfer from Oregon, but as he did so too late to be eligible for a Division I school, he transferred to Orange Coast College (OCC) for his 2012 sophomore season. In 15 games (14 starts) at OCC in 2012, Brennan had an 11–1 win–loss record with a 1.25 earned run average (ERA).

Professional career

Chicago White Sox
The Chicago White Sox selected Brennan in the fourth round, with the 141st overall selection, of the 2012 MLB draft. Brennan signed with the White Sox for a $320,800 signing bonus. After signing, he debuted with the Great Falls Voyagers of the Rookie-level Pioneer League, pitching to a 3–2 record with a 4.34 ERA in 37 innings pitched. In 2013, he pitched for the Kannapolis Intimidators of the Class A South Atlantic League, going 4–9 with a 5.53 ERA in 81 innings. Brennan spent 2014 with Great Falls, Kannapolis, and the Winston-Salem Dash of the Class A-Advanced Carolina League. He combined to go 5–1 with a 2.91 ERA in 66 innings. He spent 2015 with Winston-Salem, going 3–4  with a 3.55 ERA in 58 innings. The Chicago White Sox added Brennan to their 40-man roster after the 2015 season.

Brennan spent 2016 with Winston-Salem and the Birmingham Barons of the Double-A Southern League, going a combined 3–12 with a 6.79 ERA in 102 innings. On November 19, 2016, he was outrighted off of the 40-man roster. He spent the 2017 season with Birmingham and the Charlotte Knights of the Triple-A International League, going a combined 2–2 with a 4.68 ERA in  innings. In 2018, he again split the season between Birmingham and Charlotte, combining to go 5–4 with a 3.25 ERA in  innings. On November 2, 2018, Brennan elected free agency.

Colorado Rockies
On November 13, 2018, Brennan signed a minor league contract with the Colorado Rockies organization.

Seattle Mariners
The Seattle Mariners identified Brennan as a player to target when their analytics department identified improvements in Brennan's changeup. At the Winter Meetings in December 2018, they selected Brennan with the 13th pick in the Rule 5 draft. Brennan made the Seattle Mariners's 2019 Opening Day roster. He made his major league debut on March 21, 2019, pitching a scoreless eighth inning against the Oakland Athletics. Overall for the 2019 Mariners, he was 3–6 with a 4.56 ERA in 44 appearances, striking out 47 batters in  innings pitched. With the 2020 Mariners, Brennan recorded a 3.68 ERA with seven strikeouts in five appearances.

On April 28, 2021, Brennan was designated for assignment following the waiver claim of Jacob Nottingham.

Boston Red Sox
On May 3, 2021, Brennan was claimed off waivers by the Boston Red Sox and was assigned to the Triple-A Worcester Red Sox. He was called up and added to Boston's active roster on June 10. He pitched three scoreless innings in one appearance for the team, then was designated for assignment on June 13. He was outrighted to Triple-A Worcester on June 16. Brennan made 32 appearances for Triple-A Worcester, going 1–2 with a 5.97 ERA and 37 strikeouts. On September 14, 2021, the Red Sox released Brennan.

Atlanta Braves
On March 10, 2022, Brennan signed a minor league contract with the Atlanta Braves. He was released on July 7, 2022.

Tecolotes de los Dos Laredos
On July 14, 2022, Brennan signed with the Tecolotes de los Dos Laredos of the Mexican League.

See also
Rule 5 draft results

References

External links

Living people
1991 births
Sportspeople from Mission Viejo, California
Baseball players from California
Major League Baseball pitchers
Seattle Mariners players
Boston Red Sox players
Orange Coast Pirates baseball players
Great Falls Voyagers players
Kannapolis Intimidators players
Winston-Salem Dash players
Birmingham Barons players
Charlotte Knights players
Arizona League Mariners players
Tacoma Rainiers players
Glendale Desert Dogs players
Yaquis de Obregón players
American expatriate baseball players in Mexico
Worcester Red Sox players